Sikar district is a district of the Indian state Rajasthan in northern India. The city Sikar is the administrative headquarters of the district. Sikar, Laxmangarh, Sri Madhopur, Neem Ka Thana, and Fatehpur Shekahwati are the largest cities and tehsils of the district.

Cities and towns

Cities
Sikar
Shrimadhopur
Neem ka thana
Fatehpur

Large towns
Laxmangarh
Dantaramgarh
Reengus
Losal
Khatu
Ramgarh

Medium towns
  Kanwat Rajasthan 
 Ajeetgarh, Teh. Shrimadhopur
 Jeelo (Neem ka thana)
 Guhala (Neem ka thana)
 Patan, Teh. Neem-Ka-Thana
 Khandela
Thoi, Teh.Shrimadhopur

Sarwari(सरवड़ी) is a small town in Sikar district

Location
The district is located in the north-eastern part of the state of Rajasthan. It is bounded on the north by Jhunjhunu district, in the north-west by Churu district, in the south-west by Nagaur district and in the south-east by Jaipur district. It also touches Mahendragarh district of Haryana on its north-east corner.

The district has an area of 7742.44 km2 and a population of 26,77,737 (2011 census). Sikar, Churu district and Jhunjhunu district's comprise the Shekhawati region of Rajasthan. The old name of Sikar was "Veer Bhan Ka Bas".

Demographics

According to the 2011 census Sikar district has a population of 2,677,333, roughly equal to the nation of Kuwait or the US state of Nevada. This gives it a ranking of 150th in India (out of a total of 640). Its population growth rate over the decade 2001-2011 was 17.04%. Sikar has a sex ratio of 944 females for every 1000 males, and a literacy rate of 72.98%. 23.68% of the population lives in urban areas. Scheduled Castes and Scheduled Tribes make up 15.64% and 2.81% of the population respectively.

Languages 

At the time of the 2011 census, 92.60% of the population spoke Rajasthani, 2.78% Hindi, 1.94% Marwari and 1.94% Urdu as their first language.

Climate
The district has a hot summer, scanty rainfall, a chilly winter season and a general dryness of the air, except in the brief monsoon season. The maximum and minimum temperatures are 47 to 48 and 1 to 0 degrees Celsius, respectively. The average temperature around the year is about 35 degrees Celsius. The normal rainfall, mostly received from the southwest monsoon, is 459.8 mm.

Education 
Sikar district has become a hub for education in Rajasthan state. Pandit Deendayal Upadhyaya Shekhawati University situated in the Sikar giving student opportunity to complete their dream of higher education in many field. Along with government colleges providing arts, sciences, and commerce education, private educational institutes play a good role in imparting education in the district. Mody Institute of Technology and Science, which is in the Lakshmangarh town of the district imparts girls' education. Sobhasaria Engineering College is another college in the district. There is one Government Polytechnic College in Sikar district. District is also an emerging hub of coaching IIT-JEE and NEET.Here some famous institutes provide coaching for engineering and medical exams. Some institutes are Allen, Matrix, Kautilya, GCI, CLC, Impulse, PCP, Samarpan, Swabhiman. Sikar is the smallest city which has IIT JEE Advance centre. Youth men (below 35) provide a major role in Indian defense services compared to other districts of Rajasthan.

Administration

Sub divisions, tehsils, sub tehsils, panchayat samitis and villages

Local bodies

Police

References

External links

 Official website

 
Districts of Rajasthan
Districts in Jaipur division